Pusht Rod is a district in Farah province, Afghanistan. Its population, which is mostly Pashtun with a minority of Tajiks, was estimated at 52,000 in September 2004.

References
 UNHCR District Profile, compiled September 2004, accessed 2006-06-16 (PDF).

External links
 Map of Settlements AIMS, May 2002

Districts of Farah Province